Canestrato is a hard cheese from the Italian regions of Basilicata, Apulia, Sicily, and Abruzzo, made from a mixture of sheep milk and goat milk. It is listed on the Ark of Taste. The cheese is typical in Basilicata. It is also a specialty of Castel del Monte, Abruzzo. The Apulian variety is made using Lactobacillus brevis.

Canestrato varietals include:
Canestrato di Moliterno, a hard mixed sheep's and goats’ milk cheese from Basilicata. It is matured for at least sixty days and may be eaten at table or grated. An application for PGI status was registered in 2010.
Canestrato Pugliese Puglia, a PDO cheese made in the Province of Foggia
Canestrato Trentino

See also
 List of Italian cheeses

References

Italian cheeses
Lucanian cheeses
Cuisine of Sicily
Ark of Taste foods
Cuisine of Abruzzo